The Monster Employment Index was a monthly analysis of online job demand conducted by Monster Worldwide, running from October 2003 through December 2012. Based on a monthly review of millions of opportunities culled from a large selection of corporate career sites and job boards, including itself, the Index presented a snapshot of employer online recruitment activity in the United States, Canada, and Europe. The Monster Employment Index is now managed by Monster.com India for India , Middle east , Singapore , Malaysia  and Philippines .

Because recruitment typically precedes actual hiring by a month or two, the Monster Employment Index was considered a labor market leading indicator and a rough gauge of the overall economy.

The U.S. Monster Employment Index was released the day prior to the Bureau of Labor Statistics' Employment Situation while the Monster Employment Index Europe was published on the second Tuesday of each month, with individual reports for the UK, Germany, France, Netherlands, Italy, Sweden, and Belgium. The Monster Employment Index Canada was released quarterly.

The index was discontinued in December 2012 by Monster US but continued for MONSTER India, Gulf and SEA region. Monster Worldwide cited that as their business had moved past only online postings, the index no longer represented their business. The data is still stored by various data providers.

References

External links
 
 

Labour economics indices
Recruitment
Monster.com